Moscow City Duma District 39 is one of 45 constituencies in Moscow City Duma. The constituency covers western half of New Moscow, as well as Novo-Peredelkino and Vnukovo. District 39 was created in 2013, after Moscow City Duma had been expanded from 35 to 45 seats.

Members elected

Election results

2014

|-
! colspan=2 style="background-color:#E9E9E9;text-align:left;vertical-align:top;" |Candidate
! style="background-color:#E9E9E9;text-align:left;vertical-align:top;" |Party
! style="background-color:#E9E9E9;text-align:right;" |Votes
! style="background-color:#E9E9E9;text-align:right;" |%
|-
|style="background-color:"|
|align=left|Anton Paleyev
|align=left|United Russia
|
|39.15%
|-
|style="background-color:"|
|align=left|Viktor Sidnev
|align=left|Civic Platform
|
|27.54%
|-
|style="background-color:"|
|align=left|Nikolay Moskovchenko
|align=left|A Just Russia
|
|11.67%
|-
|style="background-color:"|
|align=left|Roman Lyabikhov
|align=left|Communist Party
|
|10.13%
|-
|style="background-color:"|
|align=left|Aleksandr Nozdrin
|align=left|Liberal Democratic Party
|
|4.19%
|-
|style="background-color:"|
|align=left|Dmitry Sysoyev
|align=left|Yabloko
|
|3.43%
|-
| colspan="5" style="background-color:#E9E9E9;"|
|- style="font-weight:bold"
| colspan="3" style="text-align:left;" | Total
| 
| 100%
|-
| colspan="5" style="background-color:#E9E9E9;"|
|- style="font-weight:bold"
| colspan="4" |Source:
|
|}

2019

|-
! colspan=2 style="background-color:#E9E9E9;text-align:left;vertical-align:top;" |Candidate
! style="background-color:#E9E9E9;text-align:left;vertical-align:top;" |Party
! style="background-color:#E9E9E9;text-align:right;" |Votes
! style="background-color:#E9E9E9;text-align:right;" |%
|-
|style="background-color:"|
|align=left|Valery Golovchenko
|align=left|Independent
|
|35.00%
|-
|style="background-color:"|
|align=left|Aleksandr Vidmanov
|align=left|Communist Party
|
|27.89%
|-
|style="background-color:"|
|align=left|Andrey Bezryadov
|align=left|A Just Russia
|
|10.47%
|-
|style="background-color:"|
|align=left|Aleksandr Mityayev
|align=left|Liberal Democratic Party
|
|10.21%
|-
|style="background-color:"|
|align=left|Nikolay Bestayev
|align=left|Communists of Russia
|
|9.98%
|-
| colspan="5" style="background-color:#E9E9E9;"|
|- style="font-weight:bold"
| colspan="3" style="text-align:left;" | Total
| 
| 100%
|-
| colspan="5" style="background-color:#E9E9E9;"|
|- style="font-weight:bold"
| colspan="4" |Source:
|
|}

References

Moscow City Duma districts